Aruch is a village in the Ashtarak Municipality of the Aragatsotn Province of Armenia. It is located on the southern part of Mount Aragats. The settlement dates back to the 6th century when it was the winter camp of the royal army. It was later made to a permanent base by Grigor Mamikonian (661-682).  The village is the location of the 7th century Armenian monastic complex Aruchavank, adjacent to it are the remains of the Mamikonians' palace.

References 

Populated places in Aragatsotn Province
Populated places established in the 6th century